Spilarctia subtestacea is a moth in the family Erebidae. It was described by Walter Rothschild in 1910. It is found in Taiwan and Korea.

References

Moths described in 1910
subtestacea